Ravin V. Caldwell, Jr.  (born August 4, 1963) is a former American football linebacker in the National Football League for the Washington Redskins from 1987 to 1992, playing on the teams that won the Super Bowl following the 1987 and 1991 seasons.  He played college football at the University of Arkansas and was drafted in the fifth round of the 1986 NFL Draft.

Caldwell is married to DeAnna Parson Caldwell (June 25, 2000). Together they have two children, a son Ashton Caldwell, born December 4, 1989 and a daughter, Ravyn Caldwell, born August 24, 2001. He also has a daughter from his relationship with former actress Teal Marchande, Talia Caldwell, who played college basketball at the University of California, Berkeley. Caldwell resides in Ashburn, Virginia.

References

1963 births
Living people
American football linebackers
Washington Redskins players
San Francisco 49ers players
Arkansas Razorbacks football players